Kashivali Tarf Alonde is a village in the Palghar district of Maharashtra, India. It is located in the Vikramgad taluka. The village has one main road, Male Road.

Demographics 

According to the 2011 census of India, Kashivali Tarf Alonde has 100 households. The effective literacy rate (i.e. the literacy rate of population excluding children aged 6 and below) is 72.42%.

References 

Villages in Vikramgad taluka